Post-dubstep is an umbrella term applied to a range of musical styles that have been influenced by the sparse, syncopated rhythms and heavy sub-bass of the UK dubstep scene. The breadth of styles associated with the term post-dubstep precluded it from being a specific musical genre in the early 2010s. Such music often references earlier dubstep productions as well as UK garage, 2-step and other forms of underground electronic dance music. Artists producing music that has been described as post-dubstep have also incorporated elements of ambient music and early 2000s R&B. The latter in particular is heavily sampled by two artists described as post-dubstep, Mount Kimbie and James Blake. The tempo of music typically characterised as post-dubstep is approximately 130 beats per minute.

The production duo Mount Kimbie is often associated with the origination of the term post-dubstep. Mount Kimbie's Maybes EP, James Blake's remix of Untold's "Stop What You're Doing" and Joy Orbison's "Hyph Mngo" can be used as markers in the breaking off of post-dubstep as a distinct sound. The commercial popularity of the xx also marked a breakaway and a member of the band, Jamie xx has released remixes which are considered post-dubstep, including a Gil Scott-Heron remix album. Other names frequently associated with post-dubstep are Ikonika, 2562, Cityscape, Deadboy, Martyn, Floating Points, Pangaea, Ramadanman, Sepalcure, FaltyDL, Pariah, Burial, The Weeknd, SBTRKT, Scuba, Egyptrixx, Persian Empire, Shackleton, Starkey, Matthew Thompson, Ital Tek, Ifan Dafydd, Guido, Four Tet and the U.K. labels Hotflush and Hyperdub.

See also
List of post-dubstep musicians

References

 
Electronic dance music genres
Music in London
Youth culture in the United Kingdom
2010s in music
English styles of music